Kálmán Konrád (23 May 1896 in Bácspalánka – 10 May 1980 in Stockholm, Sweden), an inside right, was one of the best football players in the Kingdom of Hungary in the 1910s, and played on the Hungary national team with his brother, Jenő Konrád. Kálmán, who later played for Austria, coached the Romania national team for five games in the mid-1930s. In 1999, he was listed by World Soccer as one of the 100 greatest players of all-time.

Career 
Born in Bácspalánka (Bačka Palanka), a town on the Danube River in Austria-Hungary (now part of Vojvodina, Serbia), Konrád moved to Budapest as a small child. He joined the club MTK Hungária FC in 1910 at the age of 14 and then joined the first team in the Hungarian League in 1913 at the age of 17. Konrád played for MTK from 1913 to 1919 and helped the team win the Hungarian Championship in 1914, 1917–1919 (there was no league in 1915 or 1916 because of World War I). In the three championship seasons between 1917 and 1919, MTK outscored their opponents, 376–46, and had an overall record of 60-4-2. Kálmán played in 94 games during this incredible run and scored 88 goals while a player for MTK. He was also a member of the National team, appeared in 12 games and scored two goals.

In August 1926, Kálmán was brought to the United States by Nat Agar, the owner-manager of the Brooklyn Wanderers of the American Soccer League (ASL).  Kálmán's talent was so legendary that Agar was forced to keep the transfer a secret until he was on his way to the U.S. That year, Konrád played for Brooklyn and appeared in 27 games and scored two goals. That season, he also played in the International Soccer League, a new league of American and Canadian teams. The Wanderers of the ASL participated and won the league championship with a 5–3–1 record. Konrád scored four goals while playing in every game.

After his only season in the United States, Konrád returned to Hungary and ended his playing career with MTK during the 1927–28 season. He then became a world-renowned coach and led powerful clubs such as Bayern Munich, FC Zurich, and Slavia Prague. Konrád also coached a number of teams in Sweden, where he settled and lived until his death in 1980.

Honours as manager
Malmö FF
Allsvenskan (2): 1949, 1950

References

External links
 Profile

1896 births
1980 deaths
People from Bačka Palanka
Hungarians in Vojvodina
Hungarian footballers
Hungary international footballers
MTK Budapest FC players
Austrian footballers
FC Rapid București managers
American Soccer League (1921–1933) players
Brooklyn Wanderers players
Hungarian football managers
Hungarian expatriate football managers
FC Bayern Munich managers
FC Zürich managers
SK Slavia Prague managers
FC Zbrojovka Brno managers
Malmö FF managers
Örebro SK managers
Åtvidabergs FF managers
Expatriate football managers in Czechoslovakia
Expatriate football managers in Sweden
Expatriate soccer players in the United States
Hungarian expatriate sportspeople in Czechoslovakia
Hungarian expatriate sportspeople in Sweden
Hungarian expatriate sportspeople in the United States
Association football forwards